Ngazi Sport de Mirontsi is a football club from the Comoros based in Mirontsi.

Achievements
Comoros Cup: 1
 2017

Performance in CAF competitions
CAF Confederation Cup: 1 appearance
2018 –

References

External links
Facebook page

Football clubs in the Comoros